The Symphony No. 26 in D minor, Hoboken 1/26, is one of the early Sturm und Drang Symphonies written by Joseph Haydn. It is popularly known as the Lamentatione. It was written under the auspices of Prince Nikolaus Esterházy, and is from the late 1760s, when Haydn began to experiment with minor key symphonic writing. It is also one of his first minor key symphonies.

Background 
Haydn wrote the symphony for Easter week. H. C. Robbins Landon has dated it to 1768 (possibly 1769). In the absence of the original autograph, it is impossible to verify the date of composition although this dating is consistent with the work's appearance in the Entwurf Katalog (Haydn's own catalogue of his works).  An earlier tradition suggested the symphony had been written for Christmas (at the time a much less significant religious holiday), but the oldest original extant manuscript indicates clearly that the symphony was indeed intended for Easter celebrations.

It is an early example of the Sturm und Drang style that characterised much of his symphonic output to 1774 or 1775.

Because of its association with Easter week, Haydn incorporates a melody derived from an old plainsong chant of the Passion of Christ, interpolating (as the second theme) this familiar liturgical setting to contrast with the furious opening theme.  The same lament is also picked up in the second movement, reinforcing the symphony's link to the Passion through evocation of a melody that would have been familiar to audiences of the time.

Nickname (Lamentatione) 
Since Haydn's day, the symphony has been known as "Lamentatione" because of the Christus motif of the opening movement's second theme.  As with all the nicknamed symphonies, the title is not Haydn's own.

Movements 
The work is in three movements, ending with a minuet and trio. It is scored for two oboes, bassoon, two horns, continuo (harpsichord) and a string section containing first and second violins, violas, cellos and double basses.

Allegro assai con spirito in D minor and major, 
Adagio in F major, 
Minuet e Trio in D minor (Trio in D major),

See also 
List of symphonies by name

References

Symphony 026
Compositions in D minor
1768 compositions